The 2017 Simpson Race Products Ginetta Junior Championship was a multi-event, one-make motor racing championship held across England and Scotland. The championship featured a mix of professional motor racing teams and privately funded drivers, aged between 14 and 17, competing in Ginetta G40s that conformed to the technical regulations for the championship. It formed part of the extensive program of support categories built up around the British Touring Car Championship centrepiece. It was the eleventh Ginetta Junior Championship and commenced on 1 April 2017 at Brands Hatch – on the circuit's Indy configuration – and concluded on 1 October 2017 at the same venue, utilising the Grand Prix circuit, after 25 races held at ten meetings, all in support of the 2017 British Touring Car Championship season.

Teams and drivers

Race calendar

Championship standings

Drivers' championship
A driver's best 24 scores counted towards the championship, with any other points being discarded.